Atriplex rhagodioides, the river saltbush, is a species of flowering plant in the family Amaranthaceae, found from southeastern South Australia to northwestern Victoria. It usually grows on river banks or on flats.

References

rhagodioides
Endemic flora of Australia
Flora of South Australia
Flora of Victoria (Australia)
Taxa named by Ferdinand von Mueller
Plants described in 1858